Hacıqasımlı (formerly Aşağı Hacıqasımlı) is a village and municipality in the Saatly Rayon of Azerbaijan. It has a population of 772.

References

Populated places in Saatly District